Ambergris Today is an English-language weekly newspaper published in San Pedro Town, Ambergris Caye, Belize. It is a free newspaper, marketed to tourists.

See also
List of newspapers in Belize.

References

Free newspapers
Weekly newspapers published in Belize
Publications with year of establishment missing